Liquid Love is a soul/funk influenced hard bop album recorded in 1975 by American jazz trumpeter Freddie Hubbard. The album was released in  July 1975 by Columbia label.

Track listing
"Midnight at the Oasis" (David Nichtern) - 5:30
"Put it in the Pocket" - 4:20
"Lost Dreams" (Cables) - 12:30
"Liquid Love" - 5:34
"Yesterday's Thoughts" (Benny Golson) - 3:39
"Kuntu" - 13:00
All compositions by Freddie Hubbard except as indicated
Recorded in Los Angeles, March 18 - April 16, 1975

Personnel
Freddie Hubbard - trumpet, flugelhorn
George Cables - keyboards
Ian Underwood - Moog synthesizer
Al Hall, Jr. - trombone
Carl Randall, Jr. - tenor saxophone, flute
Ray Parker Jr. - guitar
Johnny “Guitar” Watson - guitar (2 only)
Henry Franklin - bass
Chuck Rainey - Fender bass (2 only)
Carl Burnett - drums
Spider Webb - drums (2 only)
Myuto Correa - percussion
Buck Clark - congas, cowbell
Fundi - Sound Consultant

References

External links
 Freddie Hubbard-Liquid Love at Discogs

Freddie Hubbard albums
1975 albums
Columbia Records albums